The 2020 OSU Cowboys football team represented Oklahoma State University in the 2020 NCAA Division I FBS football season. The Cowboys played their home games at Boone Pickens Stadium in Stillwater, Oklahoma, and competed in the Big 12 Conference. They were led by 16th-year head coach Mike Gundy.

Previous season
The Cowboys finished the 2019 season with an 8–5 record, 5–4 Big 12 play, losing the Texas Bowl to Texas A&M.

Offseason

Coaching changes
In January 2019, head coach Mike Gundy announced the hiring of Kasey Dunn to be the new offensive coordinator, replacing Sean Gleeson, who left to take an assistant coaching position at Rutgers. Dunn was promoted from his position as the Cowboys' wide receivers coach. Additionally, former Washington Redskins coach Tim Rattay was hired to take over Gleeson's role as quarterbacks coach.

Preseason

Big 12 media days
The Big 12 media days were held on July 21–22, 2020 in a virtual format due to the COVID-19 pandemic.

Big 12 media poll

Schedule

Regular season

Oklahoma State released its 2020 schedule on October 22, 2019. The 2020 schedule consists of 7 home games and 5 away games in the regular season. The Cowboys will host 3 non-conference games against Oregon State,  Tulsa, and Western Illinois. Oklahoma State will host Iowa State, Texas Tech, West Virginia, and Texas and travel to TCU, Kansas, Oklahoma, Baylor, and Kansas State in regular season conference play.

The Cowboys' scheduled games against Oregon State and Western Illinois were canceled before the start of the 2020 season due to the COVID-19 pandemic.

Schedule Source:

Roster

Game summaries

vs Tulsa

vs West Virginia

at Kansas

vs Iowa State

vs Texas

at Kansas State

at Oklahoma

vs Texas Tech

at TCU

at Baylor

vs Miami (2020 Cheez-It Bowl)

Rankings

Players drafted into the NFL

References

Oklahoma State
Oklahoma State Cowboys football seasons
Cheez-It Bowl champion seasons
Oklahoma State Cowboys football